The Song of Mount Kumgang is a North Korean revolutionary opera. First performed in 1973, it is credited to Kim Jong-il.

The performance is considered one of the "Five Great Revolutionary Operas", a group of classical, revolution-themed opera repertoires well received within North Korea.

The orchestra uses entirely Western musical instruments, except for some bamboo wind instruments.

Plot

A family is separated during Japanese rule and reunite twenty years later, living a joyful life under the new communist system.

Reception
According to the DPRK description, "The opera represents the transformation of the mountain area, once worthless under the Japanese oppression, into the people's paradise through the portrayal of the local girls' joyful life and the hero Hwang's personal experience".

See also

List of North Korean operas
Culture of North Korea
North Korean literature
Korea under Japanese rule
Korean People's Army
Divided families in Korea

References

External links

1973 operas
Korean-language operas
Opera in North Korea
Operas set in the 20th century
Films set in Korea under Japanese rule
Films about the Korean People's Army
Films about the Korean independence movement